The Giardino Botanico della Scuola Media Statale "E.Toti" di Musile di Piave (3500 m2) is an arboretum and botanical garden located on the grounds of the middle school "E. Toti", Via Guglielmo Marconi, Musile di Piave, Province of Venice, Veneto, Italy. It is open daily.

The garden was established in 1978-79 as an outdoor classroom for the study of plants.

Specimens
Its collection includes: 
 
 Acacia saligna
 Acer campestre
 Acer pseudoplatanus
 Aesculus hippocastanum
 Albizia julibrissin
 Albizia lophanta
 Araujia sericifera
 Betula alba
 Carpinus betulus
 Catalpa bignonioides
 Cedrus atlantica
 Celtis australis
 Ceratonia siliqua
 Chorisia insignis
 Corylus avellana
 Diospyros kaki
 Eriobotrya japonica
 Erythrina crista-galli
 Feijoa sellowiana
 Gleditschia triacanthos
 Hovenia dulcis
 Juglans regia
 Macfadyena unguis-cati
 Maclura pomifera
 Magnolia grandiflora
 Ostrya carpinifolia
 Passiflora antioquiensis
 Persea americana
 Picea abies
 Pinus pinea
 Populus nigra
 Prunus avium
 Psidium guajava
 Quercus pedunculata
 Salix alba
 Ulmus campestris

See also 
 List of botanical gardens in Italy

References 
 Giardino Botanico della Scuola Media Statale "E.Toti" di Musile di Piave
 Convention on Biological Diversity - Botanic Gardens in Italy

Botanical gardens in Italy
Buildings and structures in the Metropolitan City of Venice
Gardens in Veneto